Maurice Tosh Gayflor (born 23 July 1994), who goes by the stage name Cralorboi CIC, is a Liberian Hipco and Kolopop singer, songwriter, actor and businessman. He was signed to SOG Records Empire between 2016 and 2021, and is known for the singles "Big Papa", "Jon Buttay", "Hello" featuring Joey B, and "Weekend" featuring Iyanya. He has been featured on BBC Radio 1Xtra and was part of One Africa Music Festival's global foundation event for COVID-19 awareness.

Early life
Cralorboi CIC was born in the township of Brewerville, Montserrado County, and started making music in 2013.

Music career
In 2018, CIC had his first successful international tour in Australia and become the first Liberian based artist to sell out a show in Melbourne and the third African artist behind Flavour and Bracket to do so. He performed at the Ponobiom Concert alongside Sarkodie, Stonebwoy, Samini, and Edem. CIC has also performed with Mr P, Kcee, Iyanya, Kizz Daniel and Tekno. His debut studio album, titled 1994 The Throne, was released in 2019; it features guest appearances from Medikal, Iyanya, Buffalo Souljah, Aramide and MzVee.

Ambassador
In 2017, CIC was named the brand ambassador of Lonestar Cell.

Business and acting
CIC is the owner of Cralorboi Clothing, founder of Cralorboi Empire, and a shareholder in Muscat FC. He starred in the movie Wheel and Deal.

Education
Cralorboi CIC is a BBA student in management at the African Methodist Episcopal University.

Awards and nominations

See also
List of Liberian musicians

References

1994 births
Living people
Liberian singers
Liberian actors